Irish Steel Limited, later known as Irish Ispat Limited, was an Irish semi-state company which was involved in steel production primarily from a plant on Haulbowline island in Cork Harbour. Originally founded in 1939, the company and its assets were sold to Ispat International (for IR£1) in 1996. The company and its plant closed down in 2001. 

Campaigners, including Erin Brockovich, pushed for action by the state, and €61m was allocated to clean-up the site and to redevelop it as a park. The cleanup and redevelopment project lasted upwards of a decade; from 2011 to 2021.

History
Irish Steel was originally formed as a privately owned firm in 1939, and commenced operations from a steel plant on Haulbowline island, near Cobh in Cork Harbour. This company went into receivership in the 1940s, and in 1947 the then Minister for Industry and Commerce, Seán Lemass, established a state-financed company to acquire its assets and "secure 240 jobs". 

In 1960, the state's involvement was expanded by the "Irish Steel Holdings Limited Bill (1960)", in what Jack Lynch (by then Minister for Industry and Commerce) described as addressing a "gap which would otherwise exist in [Ireland's] industrial capacity". By the late 1960s, Irish Steel was producing approximately one-third of steel used by Irish industry. At its peak, in 1971, the company employed approximately 1,200 people and had increased production to run 24-hours-a-day, seven-days-a-week. The 1981 "Industry (Transfer of Departmental Administration and Ministerial Functions) Order" transferred responsibility for Irish Steel from the Minister for Industry and Commerce to the Minister for Energy.

In 1972, Edward A. Coleman (the general manager of Irish Steel and a member of a delegation from the Confederation of Irish Industry travelling for discussions with EEC officials in Brussels), was among those killed in the Staines air disaster.

A fall in steel prices in Europe during the 1980s led to layoffs at Irish Steel, and the work-force was progressively reduced from 650. The assets of the company were sold to Irish Ispat (a subsidiary of Ispat International), for IR£1, in 1996. Under the terms of the sale agreement, Ispat International operated the Haulbowline plant under the condition that "£30 million would be invested in the plant and its 330 jobs would be secured" for at least five years. Shortly after this term ended in 2001, Ispat International announced the closure of the plant and the loss of 450 jobs.

Controversy

Safety
According to a 2005 article in The Irish Times, "Irish Ispat's tenure at Haulbowline was marked by controversy, with the firm failing to invest" as expected under the negotiated takeover agreement. There were several worker deaths between 1999 and 2001, including that of a lab technician who died in a fire. According to an inquest hearing, the plant's administrative block had no sprinklers, fire escapes or fire alarms, and that the "company's fire engine failed to start because of a flat battery". According to other reports, the plant's safety manager had been refused budget for improved fire-safety training.

Closure
The plant was closed, with limited notice, by Ispat International in 2001. At the time of closure, the company had debts of more than €57m. Reports of land and asset sales, prior to closure, led to some accusations of "asset-stripping" by the parent company. One such asset disposal, in the months prior to closure, involved the sale of a 30-acre site (for an undisclosed sum) to build a hazardous waste incinerator to the "fury of local residents". As of 2002, creditors were still owed over €20m, including over €7m due to former-workers for statutory redundancy and other payments.

Environmental impact

From at least the 1960s, waste materials (including toxic chemicals and steel slag) used in the steel production process were dumped by Irish Steel on the eastern part of Haulbowline island. This dumping site became known as the "East Tip", and was described in later reports as one of Ireland's "worst polluted former industrial sites".

The "East Tip" expanded over several decades to include 650,000 cubic metres of waste, extending eastwards from Haulbowline's naval dockyard. According to the terms of planning permission, received by Irish Steel in 1981, there were no controls placed on the material that could be dumped or on protections required to prevent leachate into the harbour. By the time of the plant's closure in 2001, radioactive and Chromium 6 contamination was found to have remained in the island's soil. Campaigners, including Erin Brockovich, requested government action on the contamination issue.

As of 2011, it was reported that the contamination at the site had cost the state "more than €50 million — mostly in legal costs". As of 2014, €52 million had been spent on clearing the site, with "a further €40 million [earmarked] to make the site safe". While the Environmental Protection Agency had attributed €15.9m of the projected site cleanup costs to Irish Ispat (formerly Irish Steel), the High Court dismissed a claim by the state to have the company's liquidator cover the cost of making the site environmentally safe. The Irish government was later threatened with legal action by the European Commission, for a failure to meet its obligations under the Waste Framework Directive. In 2016, it was reported that the remediation works budget, of €61m, would not be sufficient to complete the full cleanup and redevelopment project.

The cleanup and redevelopment of the former Irish Steel "East Tip" site took more than a decade to complete, between 2011 (when the work necessary to prepare a waste licence application was discussed) and 2021 (when the site was opened as a park). Haulbowline Island Amenity Park was officially opened in January 2021.

References

Former state-sponsored bodies of the Republic of Ireland
Iron and steel mills
Defunct manufacturing companies of the Republic of Ireland